Randy Lyness (born October 2, 1951) is an American politician who has served in the Indiana House of Representatives from the 68th district since 2015.

References

1951 births
Living people
Republican Party members of the Indiana House of Representatives
21st-century American politicians